Bill Earle (21 January 1911 – 12 April 1983) was an Australian rules footballer who played with Melbourne and Essendon in the Victorian Football League (VFL).

Notes

External links 

1911 births
1983 deaths
Australian rules footballers from Victoria (Australia)
Melbourne Football Club players
Essendon Football Club players
Stawell Football Club players